Polmont railway station is a railway station serving the village of Polmont, Scotland as well as the other Falkirk Braes villages. It is located on the Glasgow to Edinburgh via Falkirk Line and is also served by ScotRail services from Edinburgh to  Stirling and Dunblane. It is the nearest station to much of the town of Grangemouth.

History

It is situated on the Edinburgh and Glasgow Railway, which was the first railway to be built between the two cities.  It opened with the line in 1842 and became a junction eight years later with the opening of the Stirlingshire Middle Junction Railway to  via .  This linked the E&G main line with the Scottish Central Railway route northwards to  via Stirling, creating a direct route from Edinburgh to Stirling & Dunblane.  The SMJR was taken over by the E&GR prior to opening on 1 October 1850, with the E&GR being absorbed in turn by the North British Railway in 1865.  The NBR then became part of the London and North Eastern Railway on 1 January 1923.

The branch passenger service was withdrawn by the British Transport Commission on 7 May 1956, but it remained in use for freight until 1975 and has since been reopened as the heritage Bo'ness and Kinneil Railway.

The station gained a (somewhat unwanted) place in British railway history in the mid-1980s, as it was near here that the Polmont rail accident occurred in July 1984.  13 people died and more than 60 were injured when an Edinburgh to Glasgow express derailed at speed in a cutting just west of the junction, after colliding with a cow that had escaped from a field adjacent to the line (through damaged fencing) and wandered onto the track.

Services (2019) 

2 trains per hour (tph) to Glasgow Queen Street via 
2 trains per hour (tph) to Glasgow Queen Street via 
4 tph to Edinburgh Waverley

This means there is roughly a train every 15 minutes to/from Edinburgh.

The Highland Chieftain, a service operated by London North Eastern Railway from London King's Cross to  passes through the station, as does the Caledonian Sleeper service between Inverness and London Euston.  However neither stops here.

References

External links 

Railway stations in Falkirk (council area)
Former North British Railway stations
Railway stations in Great Britain opened in 1842
Railway stations served by ScotRail